NAID is an acronym which may refer to:

 In medicine, Non-Anemic Iron Deficiency
 National Association for Information Destruction
 NAID, an Association of Defence Communities (NAID/ADC)
 NAID (article identifier), a journal article identification number in Japan

See also 
 Nåid
 Noaydde